Äänekoski sub-region  is a subdivision of Central Finland and one of the Sub-regions of Finland since 2009.

Municipalities
Äänekoski (20,282)
Konnevesi (2,903)

Politics
Results of the 2018 Finnish presidential election:

 Sauli Niinistö   59.6%
 Pekka Haavisto   8.9%
 Paavo Väyrynen   8.8%
 Laura Huhtasaari   8.6%
 Merja Kyllönen   5.0%
 Matti Vanhanen   4.6%
 Tuula Haatainen   4.3%
 Nils Torvalds   0.2%

Sub-regions of Finland
Geography of Central Finland